Palaemonetes, its common names include glass shrimp, ghost shrimp, feeder shrimp, is a genus of caridean shrimp comprising a geographically diverse group of fresh water,  brackish and marine crustaceans. Conventionally, Palaemonetes  included the following species:

Palaemonetes africanus Balss, 1916
Palaemonetes antennarius (H. Milne-Edwards, 1837)
Palaemonetes antrorum Benedict, 1896
Palaemonetes argentinus Nobili, 1901
Palaemonetes atrinubes Bray, 1976
Palaemonetes australis Dakin, 1915
Palaemonetes camranhi Nguyên, 1997
Palaemonetes carteri Gordon, 1935
Palaemonetes cummingi Chace, 1954
Palaemonetes hiltoni Schmitt, 1921
Palaemonetes hobbsi Strenth, 1994
Palaemonetes intermedius Holthuis, 1949
Palaemonetes ivonicus Holthuis, 1950
Palaemonetes kadiakensis Rathbun, 1902
Palaemonetes karukera Carvacho, 1979
Palaemonetes lindsayi Villalobos Figueroa & H. H. Hobbs Jr., 1974
Palaemonetes mercedae S. Pereira, 1986
Palaemonetes mesogenitor Sollaud, 1912
Palaemonetes mesopotamicus Pesta, 1913
Palaemonetes mexicanus Strenth, 1976
Palaemonetes octaviae Chace, 1972
Palaemonetes paludosus (Gibbes, 1850)
Palaemonetes pugio Holthuis, 1949
Palaemonetes schmitti Holthuis, 1950
Palaemonetes sinensis (Sollaud, 1911)
Palaemonetes suttkusi Smalley, 1964
Palaemonetes texanus Strenth, 1976
Palaemonetes tonkinensis
Palaemonetes turcorum Holthuis, 1961
Palaemonetes vulgaris (Say, 1818)
Palaemonetes zariquieyi Sollaud, 1938

Molecular data suggest however that Palaemonetes is not phylogenetically distinct from the genus Palaemon.  Phylogenetically species of Palaemonetes, as well as those in the genera Exopalaemon and Couteriella, are nested within Palaemon. Phylogenetic affinities in these groups correspond better with geographical origin than conventional genus assignments. Palaemonetes has therefore been synonymised with Palaemon.

References

External links
 Glass Shrimp (Palaemonetes atrinubes) on Youtube

Palaemonidae
Decapod genera